Jay R. Ferguson (born July 25, 1974) is an American actor, known as Taylor Newton in Evening Shade (1990–1994), Stan Rizzo in Mad Men (2010–2015), and Ben Olinsky in The Conners (2018–present).

Biography
In 1990 Ferguson played Ponyboy Curtis in the television adaptation of S. E. Hinton's novel The Outsiders.

His notable television roles include Taylor Newton in four seasons of the CBS sitcom Evening Shade, Dr. Todd Hooper on Judging Amy, Rich Connelly in the 2005 NBC television series Surface, Agent Warren Russell on the Showtime series Sleeper Cell, Stan Rizzo on the AMC series Mad Men, and as Pat O'Neal, the father of the O'Neal family in the ABC series The Real O'Neals.

His film roles include Billy in Higher Learning, Elmer Conway in The Killer Inside Me, and Keith Clayton in The Lucky One.

In 2018, he played Chip Curry in the CBS sitcom Living Biblically. Since 2018, he has played Darlene's boss (and eventual husband), Ben Olinsky, in The Conners.

Filmography

Film

Television films

Television series

References

External links
 
 Jay R. Ferguson at Yahoo! Movies

1974 births
20th-century American male actors
21st-century American male actors
American child models
American male child actors
American male film actors
American male television actors
Living people
Male actors from Dallas